Hisonotus francirochai is a species of catfish in the family Loricariidae. It is native to South America, where it occurs in the Grande River basin. The species reaches 3.6 cm (1.4 inches) SL.

References 

Otothyrinae
Fish described in 1928